Monte Cavallo is a comune (municipality) in the Province of Macerata in the Italian region Marche, located about  southwest of Ancona and about  southwest of Macerata.

Monte Cavallo borders the following municipalities: Pieve Torina, Serravalle di Chienti, Visso.

Demographic evolution

References

Cities and towns in the Marche